Crowdy Head is a headland on the coast of New South Wales, Australia, 7km from Harrington between Forster and Port Macquarie. The head is mostly cleared and was quarried between 1895 and 1901 for the Manning River training wall.

And has a small harbour with a dedicated Marine Rescue NSW rescue boat, It is also home to Crowdy Head Surf Life Saving Club.

References

Further reading

Headlands of New South Wales
Coastal towns in New South Wales